The 2014–15 UNC Asheville Bulldogs men's basketball team represented the University of North Carolina at Asheville during the 2014–15 NCAA Division I men's basketball season. The Bulldogs, led by second year head coach Nick McDevitt, played their home games at Kimmel Arena and were members of the Big South Conference. They finished the season 15–16, 10–8 in Big South play to finish in a tie for sixth place. They advanced to the quarterfinals of the Big South tournament where they lost to Coastal Carolina.

Roster

Schedule

|-
!colspan=9 style="background:#00438C; color:#FFFFFF;"| Exhibition

|-
!colspan=9 style="background:#00438C; color:#FFFFFF;"| Regular season

|-
!colspan=9 style="background:#00438C; color:#FFFFFF;"|Big South tournament

References

UNC Asheville Bulldogs men's basketball seasons
UNC Asheville
Asheville
Asheville